Iveco ACTL is a military transport vehicle produced by IVECO for the Italian Army. It was developed to integrate and replace the previous  Iveco ACM 80/90 truck.

The vehicle was introduced in 2002 in the 4x4 version and in 2000 in the 8x8 version, used for the transport of containers. The 4x4 version can be airlifted.

External links
Description page at the Italian Armed Forces inventory 

ACTL
Military trucks of Italy
Military vehicles introduced in the 2000s